The  is a commuter electric multiple unit (EMU) train type operated by the private railway operator Odakyu Electric Railway in Japan since 26 March 2020.

Formation
The trains are formed as follows, with ten cars per set.

All motor cars except M5 have one single-arm pantograph.

Interior
Seating accommodation consists of longitudinal seating. The interior also features a warm color palette, wood flooring, air purifiers, LED lighting, security cameras, and wheelchair spaces.

Technical specifications
The trains use SiC–VVVF technology. The bogies are built by Nippon Sharyo.

History
Odakyu announced initial details of the trains on 26 April 2019. Five sets were built by Kawasaki Heavy Industries, two were built by Japan Transport Engineering Company, and three were built by Nippon Sharyo. The first train was revealed to the press on 11 November 2019. The train entered service on 26 March 2020.

Another batch consisting of three trainsets will be constructed according to Odakyu Railway's 2022 capital investiment plan. The new trainsets are set to replace three older Odakyu 1000 series trainsets.

References

External links

 Odakyu news release 

Electric multiple units of Japan
5000 series (2019)
Train-related introductions in 2020

J-TREC multiple units
Kawasaki multiple units
1500 V DC multiple units of Japan
Nippon Sharyo multiple units